In dynamical systems, a branch of mathematics, a structure formed from the stable manifold and unstable manifold of a fixed point.

Definition for maps 
Let  be a map defined on a manifold , with a fixed point .
Let  and  be the stable manifold and the unstable manifold
of the fixed point , respectively. Let  be a connected invariant manifold such that

Then  is called a homoclinic connection.

Heteroclinic connection 
The condition satisfied by
 is replaced with:

Homoclinic and heteroclinic intersections 
The figure has a conceptual drawing illustrating their complicated structure. The theoretical result supporting the drawing is the lambda-lemma. Homoclinic tangles are always accompanied by a Smale horseshoe.

Definition for continuous flows 
For continuous flows, the definition is essentially the same.

Comments 
 There is some variation in the definition across various publications;
 Historically, the first case considered was that of a continuous flow on the plane, induced by an ordinary differential equation. In this case, a homoclinic connection is a single trajectory that converges to the fixed point  both forwards and backwards in time. A pendulum in the absence of friction is an example of a mechanical system that does have a homoclinic connection. When the pendulum is released from the top position (the point of highest potential energy), with infinitesimally small velocity, the pendulum will return to the same position. Upon return, it will have exactly the same velocity. One of the demonstrations in the pendulum article exhibits this behavior.

Significance 
When a dynamical system is perturbed, a homoclinic connection splits. It becomes a disconnected invariant set. Near it, there will be a chaotic set called Smale's horseshoe. Thus, the existence of a homoclinic connection can potentially lead to chaos. For example, when a pendulum is placed in a box, and the box is subjected to small horizontal oscillations, the pendulum may exhibit chaotic behavior.

See also
 Homoclinic orbit
 Heteroclinic orbit

Dynamical systems